Joghghal may refer to:
 Joghghal-e Aviyeh
 Joghghal-e Khvayeh